Juncosa is a surname. Notable people with the surname include:

Francisco Cortés Juncosa (born 1983), Spanish field hockey player
Joaquim Juncosa (1631–1708), Spanish painter and monk
Nuria Juncosa (born 1952), Spanish painter, cinematographer and web artist 
Sylvia Juncosa, American guitarist, singer, songwriter, and keyboardist